Hellandbridge is a hamlet in Cornwall, England, UK. It is about a mile west-northwest of the village of Helland (where the population at the 2011 census was included ) on the River Camel and next to the railway line to Wenford Bridge.

References

Hamlets in Cornwall